Barry Raymond Daines (born 30 September 1951) is a former professional footballer. He played in the Football League for Tottenham Hotspur, Mansfield Town and for Bulova SA in Hong Kong. Daines also represented England at youth level in the position of goalkeeper.

Football career
Daines joined Tottenham Hotspur as an apprentice in September 1969. He made a total of 146 appearances between 1971 and 1981. Daines was substitute in both legs of the 1972 UEFA Cup Final. Throughout much of his time at Tottenham he was understudy to Pat Jennings, he did however play in all 42 league matches in the 1977–78 season. In 1981 Tottenham awarded Daines a testimonial. The game played in May 1981, resulted in Tottenham beating West Ham United 3–2 at White Hart Lane.

He played in the Hong Kong First Division between 1981 and 1983 for Bulova SA before ending his professional career at Mansfield Town and making a further 21 appearances. Daines also appeared on the books at Chelmsford City, following his departure from Mansfield.

Post–football career
Daines went on to become a supermarket manager in Essex.

References

External links
Pen-picture
Photo of Barry

1951 births
Living people
Tottenham Hotspur F.C. players
Bulova SA players
Mansfield Town F.C. players
Chelmsford City F.C. players
People from Witham
English Football League players
Association football goalkeepers
English footballers
UEFA Cup winning players
English expatriate footballers
Expatriate footballers in Hong Kong
English expatriate sportspeople in Hong Kong